Stabri Monogo (better known as The traveler Doll or Stabri) is a popular character that passes from hand to hand and travels around the world. Created in 2006, it emerged as a spontaneous idea of two Spanish computer workers trying to see how well connected the Internet truly is.

References

External links
Stabri's Official website in English
Stabri's Official website in Spanish

Image-sharing websites